F61 may refer to:
 Farman F.61, a French reconnaissance aircraft
 , a J-class destroyer of the Royal Navy
 , a Salisbury-class frigate of the Royal Navy
  an ocean liner requisitioned for the Royal Navy
 Northrop F-61 Black Widow, an American fighter aircraft